Margaret Nyakang'o, is an accountant, financial manager and civil servant in Kenya, who was nominated as the "Controller of Budget of the Republic of Kenya", on 18 November 2019, the second person to serve in that capacity, since the office was established. She was sworn into office on 4 December 2019, having been approved by Parliament, the previous day. Immediately prior to her current assignment, she was a director at the Kenya National Bureau of Statistics (KNBS).

Background and education
Margaret Nyakang'o was born in Kenya circa 1959. She holds a Doctor of Business Administration (DrBA) degree, obtained from the University of Liverpool, in the United Kingdom. She is also a Member of the Institute of Certified Public Accountants of Kenya (ICPAK).

Career
Nyakang'o is a certified public accountant (CPA). She has previously worked as the Director of Finance at the Africa International University, in Karen, Nairobi, Kenya. She was selected as the best candidate out of a field of fifteen applicants, including the acting Controller of Budget, Stephen Masha. She will now be interviewed by the Parliamentary Committee on Finance and National Planning. If she survives the vetting, her name will be forwarded to President Uhuru Kenyatta for approval. She replaces Agnes Odhiambo, the first Controller of Budget, whose eight-year non-renewable term came to an end on 27 August 2019.

Family
Dr. Margaret Nyakang'o is married to David Nyakang'o. Son Tuesday nyakang'o

Other considerations
Margaret Nyakang'o is a member of the Association of Women Accountants of Kenya, where she mentors young, aspiring, women professionals.

See also
Government of Kenya
Counties of Kenya
Economy of Kenya
Stella Kilonzo

References

External links
Controller of Budget nominee Margaret Nyakang’o set for vetting As of 20 November 2019.
Website of The Office of the Controller of Budget of the Republic of Kenya

Living people
1959 births
Kenyan accountants
Alumni of the University of Liverpool
Women accountants
20th-century Kenyan businesswomen
20th-century Kenyan businesspeople
Kenyan women business executives
Kenyan civil servants